Bolna Station is a train station on the Nordland Line at Bolna in Rana Municipality in Nordland county, Norway. The station opened in 1947, but it is now closed to regular traffic.

References  

Railway stations in Nordland
Railway stations on the Nordland Line
Rana, Norway
Railway stations opened in 1947
1947 establishments in Norway